Brantice is a municipality and village in Bruntál District in the Moravian-Silesian Region of the Czech Republic. It has about 1,400 inhabitants.

Administrative parts
The village of Radim is administrative part of Brantice.

Geography
Brantice is located in the Nízký Jeseník mountain range. The built-up area lies in the valley of the Opava River.

History
The first written mention of Brantice is from 1222. In 1377, it became a part of the Duchy of Krnov.

According to the Austrian census of 1910 the village had 1,211 inhabitants, 1,173 (99.8%) were German-speaking. Most populous religious group were Roman Catholics with 1,195 (98.7%).

Gallery

References

External links

 

Villages in Bruntál District